Merriwa is a monotypic genus of wasps belonging to the family Platygastridae. The only species is Merriwa quadridentata.

The species is found in Central Malesia.

References

Platygastridae